The Georgia men's national under-20 basketball team is a national basketball team of Georgia, administered by the Georgian Basketball Federation. It represents the country in international men's under-20 basketball competitions.

FIBA U20 European Championship participations

See also
Georgia men's national basketball team
Georgia men's national under-18 basketball team
Georgia women's national under-20 basketball team

References

External links
Archived records of Georgia team participations

Basketball in Georgia (country)
Basketball
Men's national under-20 basketball teams